Alice Ann Doreen Simicak (née Whitty; March 24, 1934 – January 7, 2017) was a female high jumper from Canada, who represented her native country at the 1956 Summer Olympics in Melbourne, Australia. A resident of Richmond, British Columbia, she claimed the silver medal in the women's high jump event at the 1959 Pan American Games, alongside Chile's Renata Friedrichs.

Whitty died on January 7, 2017, in Richmond at the age of 82.

References

External links 
 
 
 

1934 births
2017 deaths
Canadian female high jumpers
Olympic track and field athletes of Canada
Athletes (track and field) at the 1952 Summer Olympics
Athletes (track and field) at the 1956 Summer Olympics
Commonwealth Games bronze medallists for Canada
Commonwealth Games medallists in athletics
Athletes (track and field) at the 1954 British Empire and Commonwealth Games
Pan American Games silver medalists for Canada
Pan American Games medalists in athletics (track and field)
Athletes (track and field) at the 1955 Pan American Games
Athletes (track and field) at the 1959 Pan American Games
Medalists at the 1959 Pan American Games
People from Richmond, British Columbia
Sportspeople from British Columbia
Medallists at the 1954 British Empire and Commonwealth Games